Brontotheriidae is a family of extinct mammals belonging to the order Perissodactyla, the order that includes horses, rhinoceroses, and tapirs. Superficially, they looked rather like rhinos, although they were actually more closely related to horses; Equidae and Brontotheriidae make up the suborder Hippomorpha. They lived around 56–34 million years ago, until the very close of the Eocene.

Characteristics and evolution

Brontotheres retain four toes on their front feet and three toes on their hind feet. Their teeth are adapted to shearing (cutting) relatively nonabrasive vegetation. Their molars have a characteristic W-shaped ectoloph (outer shearing blade). 

The evolutionary history of this group is well known due to an excellent fossil record in North America. The earliest brontotheres, such as Eotitanops, were rather small, no more than a meter in height, and hornless.

Brontotheres evolved massive bodies, although some small species such as Nanotitanops did persist through the Eocene. Some genera, such as Dolichorhinus, evolved highly elongated skulls. The North American brontothere Megacerops, for example, evolved large sexually dimorphic paired horns above their noses. The sexually dimorphic horns suggest that brontotheres were highly gregarious (social) and males may have performed some sort of head-clashing behavior in competition for mates. Unlike rhinoceros, in which the horns are made of keratin, however, the horns of brontotheres are composed of bone (the frontal bone and nasal bone) and were placed side-to-side rather than front-to-back.

Brontotheres probably became extinct because they could not adapt to drier conditions and tougher vegetation (such as grasses) that spread during the Oligocene.

Classification

Two classification systems for Brontotheriidae are presented below. The first contains 43 genera and 8 subfamilies, and although it is based on a 1997 publication by McKenna and Bell, it summarizes research that was conducted before 1920 and is badly outdated. The second classification is based on 2004 and 2005 research by Mihlbachler et al., which indicates that many of the previous subfamily names are invalid. Several more recently discovered brontotheres are included in the newer classification.

Although Lambdotherium and Xenicohippus were previously included in Brontotheriidae, they are no longer considered members of this family. Lambdotherium, though excluded, may be the closest known relative to brontotheres. Xenicohippus is now thought to be an early member of the horse family, Equidae.

References

Further reading

External links

Brontotheroidea at Mikko's Phylogeny Archive

 
Eocene first appearances
Eocene extinctions
Prehistoric mammal families